Linda Asper (born 1 December 1943) is a politician in Manitoba, Canada.  She joined the Liberal Party and then later returned to the New Democratic Party during the 1990s.  She was a member of the Manitoba legislature from 1999 to 2003.

Asper holds a Ph.D. in Education, and had an extensive career as an educator before entering political life. She was a Winnipeg school trustee for the Seine River division, and served as President of the Manitoba Teachers' Society and Vice-President of the Canadian Teachers' Federation for a period of time.  Asper was also a member of the Faculty Council of the University of Manitoba, and served on the board of governors at St. Boniface College.  In addition to her career in education, she was a member of the Manitoba Action Committee on the Status of Women.

In the 1990 provincial election, Asper ran as a Liberal in the south Winnipeg riding of Niakwa.  She was defeated by Progressive Conservative candidate Jack Reimer by 4950 votes to 4301.

By 1999, Asper had crossed over to the New Democratic Party.  In that year's provincial election, she was elected as a New Democratic for the Winnipeg riding of Riel, defeating Progressive Conservative incumbent David Newman 4833 votes to 4559.

In April 2003, Asper announced that she was leaving politics to take a position with Education International an advocacy group based in Brussels, Belgium.  She now promotes the rights of both children and educators on an international level, and has been a vocal opponent of child labour practices.

Linda Asper was the sister-in-law of the late Israel Asper.

References

New Democratic Party of Manitoba MLAs
Politicians from Winnipeg
Women MLAs in Manitoba
Living people
21st-century Canadian politicians
21st-century Canadian women politicians
1943 births